The Northern Velebit National Park is a national park in Croatia that covers 109 km2 of the northern section of the Velebit mountains, the largest mountain range in Croatia. Because of the abundant variety of this part of the Velebit range, the area was upgraded from a nature reserve in 1999, and opened as a national park in September the same year.

The whole of the Velebit range is a "nature park", a lesser conservation category. Another national park on Velebit is the Paklenica on its southern side.

In 2017, the beech forests within the national park were added to the UNESCO World Heritage Site known as Ancient and Primeval Beech Forests of the Carpathians and Other Regions of Europe because of their testimony to the ecological history of forest dynamics within Europe since the last Ice Age.

The park
The park reserve is protected and visitors are restricted to designated trails. Inside the reserve is the Visibaba (Galanthus) botanical reserve, with an abundance of the endemic Croatian subspecies of Sibiraea altaiensis, and the Zavižan–Balinovac–Velika kosa botanical reserve, famous for its outstanding collection of mountain flora species. Inside the reserve is the well-known Velebit Botany Garden, founded by pharmacology professor and botanist Fran Kušan in 1967.

The Park is criss-crossed with mountaineering trails. The best-known is Premužić's Trail, named after its constructor, the forester Ante Premužić who built it in late 1933. The path runs through the most beautiful and most interesting parts of the park. From the numerous peaks in the surroundings there are magnificent views of the Adriatic Sea and its islands (Pag, Rab, Goli Otok, Prvić and Krk) as well as of the continental side. 

Adding to the Park's cultural value are the numerous ruins of so-called "summer lodges".  These remain from when Velebit was populated by shepherds and cattle farmers. On its coastal slopes are many ruined houses, lodges and stone walls, all the remaining evidence of a lost local population.

The Zavižan (1676 m) peak is within the park, the highest meteorological station in Croatia.

Special reservations

The special reservations in the park are two locales called Hajdučki kukovi and Rožanski kukovi. Their names come from a folk name given to large stone masses which rise up over the surroundings of the Velebit mountains. They are in the center of the park, but are not a regular part of it, access to them is restricted to  scientific researchers and educational visitors.

Hajdučki kukovi
Hajdučki kukovi is one of the Kukovi group of peaks in the northern part of the Velebit. Together with Rožanski kukovi it forms an area of around 22 km2 declared as a nature reserve in 1969. It is separated from Rožanski kukovi by the Skrbina Draga and Veliki Lubenovac field.

The kukovi group has around 40 summits exceeding 1600 m. The area around Hajdučki kukovi has a complex underground drainage system. The terrain is much wilder than around Rožanski kukovi, and there are parts where even today no human foot has ever trod. Lukina jama, the deepest mountain cave in Croatia and one of the deepest in southeast Europe, with a depth of 1392 m, was discovered in 1992 by a local caving enthusiast named Ozren Lukić.  Lukić joined a mountain division during the war (1991–95) as a volunteer and was killed by a sniper in 1992. Lukina jama was named after him.

Rožanski kukovi

The first "kuk", Gromovača (1675 m), is a two-and-a-half-hour walk from the hostel in Zavižan. The centre of the rocks begin immediately behind Rossijeva koliba (a mountain hut), also 2.5 hours' walk from the hostel. The most interesting part of this rocky region is on the path from Rossilijeva koliba to Crikvena (1641 m), half an hour's walk from the hut.

In an area of about 18 km2 there are more than fifty stony peaks, all over 1600 m, some with bizarre shapes of towers, spires or obelisks. Here all the phenomena of karst rock meet – chasms, dizzying heights, crevices, caves, natural gateways and passes.

The best-known and most popular sights are Novotnijev kuk, Rossilijev kuk and Premužićev kuk.

Climate

See also
 Geography of Croatia
 Rewilding Europe
 Zavratnica

References

External links

 Awarded "EDEN - European Destinations of Excellence" non traditional tourist destination 2009

Northern Velebit
Biosphere reserves of Croatia
Dinaric Alps
1999 establishments in Croatia
Protected areas established in 1999
Protected areas of Lika-Senj County
Primeval Beech Forests in Europe